The 2015–16 season was Gillingham's 123rd season in their existence and third consecutive season in League One. Along with League One, the club competed in the FA Cup, League Cup, Football League Trophy and the regional Kent Senior Cup. The season covers the period from 1 July 2015 to 30 June 2016.

Transfers

Transfers in

Transfers out

Loans in

Loans out

Competitions

Pre-season friendlies

League One

League table

Matches
On 17 June 2015, the fixtures for the season were announced.

League Cup

Football League Trophy

FA Cup

References

2015-16
Gillingham
2010s in Kent